La Riela is one of 54 parish councils in Cangas del Narcea, a municipality within the province and autonomous community of Asturias, in northern Spain. 

The parish's villages include: Aciu, Caldeviḷḷa d'Aciu, Pinḷḷés, Parandones, Perdieḷḷu, Reboḷḷas, La Riela, Sebil, Veigaipope, Veiga, La Veiga de Pinḷḷés and Yema.

References

Parishes in Cangas del Narcea